De'Ondre Wesley (born July 28, 1992) is an American football offensive tackle for the Edmonton Elks of the Canadian Football League (CFL). He played college football at Brigham Young from 2013 to 2014. He previously attended junior college at Diablo Valley College.

Professional career

Baltimore Ravens
Wesley was signed by the Baltimore Ravens on May 2, 2015 after going undrafted. On September 3, 2016, he was placed on injured reserve.

On September 1, 2017, Wesley was waived by the Ravens during final roster cutdowns.

Buffalo Bills
On September 5, 2017, Wesley was signed to the Buffalo Bills' practice squad. He signed a reserve/future contract with the Bills on January 8, 2018.

On September 1, 2018, Wesley was waived by the Bills and was signed to the practice squad the next day. He was released on September 13, 2018.

Indianapolis Colts
On November 6, 2018, Wesley was signed to the Indianapolis Colts practice squad, but was released a week later. He was re-signed on December 5, 2018. He signed a reserve/future contract on January 13, 2019. He was waived on May 21, 2019.

Buffalo Bills (second stint)
On May 22, 2019, Wesley was claimed off of waivers by the Buffalo Bills. He was waived with an injury settlement on August 28, 2019.

DC Defenders
Wesley was drafted in the 2020 XFL Draft by the DC Defenders. He had his contract terminated when the league suspended operations on April 10, 2020.

Edmonton Elks
Wesley signed with the Edmonton Elks of the CFL on April 1, 2021.

References

External links
BYU Cougars Bio
Baltimore Ravens bio

1992 births
Living people
American football offensive tackles
Baltimore Ravens players
Buffalo Bills players
BYU Cougars football players
Diablo Valley Vikings football players
Edmonton Elks players
Indianapolis Colts players
DC Defenders players
People from Antioch, California
Sportspeople from Castro Valley, California
Players of American football from California
Sportspeople from the San Francisco Bay Area